Portal is a town in Bulloch County, Georgia, United States. The population was 638 at the 2010 census.

History
The Georgia General Assembly incorporated Portal as a town in 1914. It is unknown why the name "Portal" was applied to this place.

Geography 
Portal is located at  (32.537275, -81.931738).

Demographics 

As of the census of 2000, there were 597 people, 232 households, and 167 families residing in the town. The racial makeup of the town was 82.24% White, 15.24% African American, 0.17% Asian, 0.17% Pacific Islander, 1.17% from other races, and 1.01% from two or more races. Hispanic or Latino of any race were 1.17% of the population.

There were 232 households, out of which 31.9% had children under the age of 18 living with them, 58.6% were married couples living together, 9.9% had a female householder with no husband present, and 27.6% were non-families. 22.8% of all households were made up of individuals, and 13.4% had someone living alone who was 65 years of age or older. The average household size was 2.57 and the average family size was 3.00.

In the town, the population was spread out, with 27.1% under the age of 18, 9.0% from 18 to 24, 26.6% from 25 to 44, 21.6% from 45 to 64, and 15.6% who were 65 years of age or older. The median age was 36 years. For every 100 females, there were 97.7 males. For every 100 females age 18 and over, there were 88.3 males.

The median income for a household in the town was $30,268, and the median income for a family was $34,000. Males had a median income of $24,583 versus $19,375 for females. The per capita income for the town was $14,514. About 8.2% of families and 14.4% of the population were below the poverty line, including 16.0% of those under age 18 and 15.6% of those age 65 or over.

Notable people

Brooks Brown (1985-), American professional baseball pitcher for the Colorado Rockies of Major League Baseball (MLB). Brown attended Portal High School and played baseball there. He attended the University of Georgia, playing in college. He played for several minor league teams before being  called up to the majors for the first time on July 6, 2014.
 Dr. Leila Denmark (1898–2012), a pediatrician, author and researcher who blazed trails for women in medicine, and lived to be 114
 Matthew L. Gibson (1985-), Science instructor emeritus at Portal High School and Curator of Natural History at the Charleston Museum, credited as America's First Museum. Gibson also published a Journal of Paleontology articles which designate a new species of pontoporiid dolphin, Auroracetus bakerae as well as a new species of protocetid whale, Tupelocetus palmeri. He is a research member of the Don Sundquist Center for Excellence in Paleontology.
 Sebastian McBride, African-American man who was lynched by whites on August 27, 1904; the fourth lynching  victim of white racial violence that month in Bulloch County 
Cameron Sheffield (1988-), American football defensive end who is a member of the Edmonton Eskimos. He was drafted by the Kansas City Chiefs in the fifth round of the 2010 NFL Draft.
 Ruby Stone (1924–2013), born in Portal and later moved to Idaho, where she became a politician and was elected as a state legislator.

References

External links
 Old Portal historical marker
 Upper Lotts Creek Primitive Baptist Church and Cemetery historical marker

Towns in Georgia (U.S. state)
Towns in Bulloch County, Georgia